The Scannerless Boolean Parser is an open-source scannerless GLR parser generator for boolean grammars. It was implemented in the Java programming language and generates Java source code. SBP also integrates with Haskell via LambdaVM.

External links
 SBP: the Scannerless Boolean Parser
 SBP LDTA'06 article
 WIX - wiki markup parser in SBP Haskell

Parser generators
Free software programmed in Java (programming language)
Software using the BSD license